Whatever and Ever Amen is the second album by Ben Folds Five, released in 1997.  Three singles were released from the album, including the lead single, "Battle of Who Could Care Less", which received significant airplay on alternative radio and on MTV, and peaked at #26 on the UK Singles Chart and #22 on the Billboard Modern Rock Tracks chart, and the band's biggest hit, "Brick", which was a top-40 song in numerous countries.

A remaster was made available on March 22, 2005. All of the extra tracks had been previously released (as b-sides, soundtrack contributions, etc.) except for a cover of the Buggles song "Video Killed the Radio Star," which is a staple of Ben Folds Five's live show.

Title, recording and cover

Title
While recording the album, Folds told the Sheffield Electronic Press in November 1996 that the album would likely either be titled Cigarette or The Little Girl With Teeth. The title Whatever and Ever Amen comes from a line in the song "Battle of Who Could Care Less."

Cover
The album's original cover featured individual photos of Folds, Sledge, and Jessee, along with a hand-drawn Ben Folds Five logo, and a hand-drawn "Whatever and Ever Amen." The cover of the 2005 remastered version moved the album's title from the top left corner to the center and added a fourth photo of all three bandmates sitting together.

Recording
The album was recorded in the front room of a house in Chapel Hill, North Carolina. Folds said, "You can't go for perfection in a house. The spiritual comet of the song comes by every so often and lots of technical things are going to be going wrong when that happens. Our producer, Caleb is very good at knowing when the ghost blew through the house. People don't buy records for the accuracy." The first release for their new label, Epic, Folds said the record company did not get to hear the recording until it was finished, saying, "they knew what they were getting into."

Track notes
Near the end of the Nerdist podcast #132, Folds mentioned that the lyrics for "Cigarette" were taken from a newspaper article he claimed was about a man, Fred Jones, who "felt conflicted" after finding his wife had a changed personality due to a brain tumor, on the basis that she was not the same person he had married. (The article, from a 1991 edition of The Tennessean, is actually about the implanted epidural catheter procedure that brought Jones and his wife renewed peace after her years of pain.)  The "sequel" track, "Fred Jones Part Two," is on Folds' first solo album, Rockin' the Suburbs.

The track "Steven's Last Night in Town" was written about Ben Folds' friend Stephen Short, a Grammy-Award-winning record producer and manager.

An early mix of "Song for the Dumped" appeared on the soundtrack album for the movie "Mr. Wrong," but the song did not actually appear in the movie. The soundtrack was released on February 6, 1996, a full year before the release of "Whatever and Ever Amen."

Hidden tracks
The first pressing of Whatever and Ever Amen features a clip of an actual argument in the studio between Folds, Sledge and Jessee, inserted between "Brick" and "Song for the Dumped." Speaking to The Shrubbery in 1999, Folds said that the clip "was a painfully documented real argument that kept bringing up bad feelings. We decided to get rid of it and let the first pressings be collectors ... Better to keep the band together. It was ugly."

The first pressing featured another hidden track, on the album's last track, "Evaporated," and in the negative space of track 1 on the Digitally Remastered version. The clip is at a live concert, where band roadie Leo Overtoom yells out, "I've got your hidden track right here: Ben Folds is a fuckin' asshole!" A short video clip of this is featured in the video "A Video Portrait" released alongside the album.

Legacy
Nick Hornby writes one of his essays in the book 31 Songs about "Smoke".

Track listing

Personnel

The band
Ben Folds - Piano, lead vocals, electric piano, melodica
Darren Jessee - Drums, percussion, backing vocals
Robert Sledge - Bass guitar, double bass, backing vocals

Additional musicians
John Catchings - Cello on 5 and 12
Alicia Svigals - Violin on 9
Matt Darriau - Clarinet on 9
Frank London - Trumpet on 9
Caleb Southern - Hammond organ on 3
Norwood Cheek - Synthesizer space sound on 1

Production
Caleb Southern - Producer, Engineer
Ben Folds - Producer, Engineer
Andy Wallace - Mixing
Steve Sisco - Mixing Assistant
Howie Weinberg - Mastering
John Mark Painter - String arrangements
Leigh Smiler - Cover Design
Chris Stamey - Pro-Tools
The Klezmatics - Special Contributor

Certifications

}
}
}
}

Charts

Weekly charts

Year-end charts

References

Ben Folds Five albums
1997 albums
Albums produced by Caleb Southern
Albums produced by Ben Folds